The Five Forty Eight is a 1979 American television adaptation of John Cheever's short story of the same name, directed by James Ivory.

Cast
 Laurence Luckinbill as Blake
 Mary Beth Hurt as Miss Dent
 Laurinda Barrett as Louise Blake
 Dale Hodges as Receptionist
 Kathy Keeney as Anne Blake
 Philip Scher as Charlie Blake
 Jon De Vries as Henry Watkins
 Nicholas Luckinbill as Tad Watkins
 Ann McDonough as June Thorpe
 Robert Hitt as Price
 Tiger Haynes as Guard
 Susan Hovey as Girl in elevator
 John Ramsey as Bartender
 John Harkins as Trace Bearden
 Adam Petroski as Conductor

External links
 Official Site from Merchant Ivory
 

1979 television films
1979 films
American television films
Films directed by James Ivory
Merchant Ivory Productions films